Tłustomosty (pronounced: , German: Stolzmütz) is a village located in the Opole Voivodeship (southern Poland), Głubczyce County, Gmina Baborów.

References

Villages in Głubczyce County